Raymond Maurice Ruddy (August 31, 1911 – December 4, 1938) was an American competition swimmer who represented the United States as a 16-year-old at the 1928 Summer Olympics in Amsterdam, Netherlands.  He competed in the men's 400-meter freestyle, and placed sixth in event final with a time of 5:25.0.  He also finished fourth overall in the men's 1,500-meter freestyle in a time of 21:05.0.

Ruddy was born in New York City, the son of 1904 Olympic swimmer Joe Ruddy.  He attended Columbia University in New York, where he was a member of the Columbia Lions swimming and diving team in National Collegiate Athletic Association (NCAA) competition.  He won the 1930 NCAA national championships in the 440-yard freestyle with a time of 4:55.6.

At the 1936 Summer Olympics in Berlin, Germany, he was a member of the ninth-place U.S. water polo team.

Ruddy died as a result of brain injuries sustained in an accident fall in 1938; he was 27 years old.

In 1977, he was inducted into the USA Water Polo Hall of Fame.

See also
 List of Columbia University alumni

References

External links

 

1911 births
1938 deaths
American male freestyle swimmers
American male water polo players
Columbia Lions men's swimmers
Olympic swimmers of the United States
Olympic water polo players of the United States
Sportspeople from New York City
Swimmers at the 1928 Summer Olympics
Water polo players at the 1936 Summer Olympics
Accidental deaths from falls
Deaths from head injury